The 2022–23 Slovak First Football League (known as Fortuna liga for sponsorship reasons) is the 30th season of top-tier football league in Slovakia since its establishment in 1993.

The winter break began earlier than usual this season due to the 2022 FIFA World Cup in Qatar, with the last full round scheduled for 11–13 November 2022. Four postponed matches then took place on 24 and 27 November. The first round after the winter break was scheduled for 10–12 February 2023.

Slovan Bratislava are the record four-time consecutive defending champions.

Teams

Team changes
Twelve teams are competing in the league – nine teams from the previous season and three teams promoted from the 2. Liga.

Podbrezová (promoted to the top flight for the second time) earned an automatic promotion thanks to the victory of the 2. Liga, replacing Pohronie (relegated after two years in the top flight), who finished last in the 2021–22 Slovak First Football League.

Dukla Banská Bystrica (promoted after seven years of absence) and Skalica (promoted to the top flight for the third time) were also promoted, and they will replace Senica and Sereď – two teams that did not obtain a licence for the 2022–23 season.

Stadiums and locations

Personnel and kits

Managerial changes

Regular stage

League table

Results
Each team plays home-and-away against every other team in the league, for a total of 22 matches each.

Championship group

Relegation group

Season statistics

Top goalscorers

Hat-tricks

Note
4 Player scored 4 goals

Top assists

Clean sheets

Discipline

Player

 Most yellow cards: 8

  Mário Hollý (Skalica)

 Most red cards: 2
  Erik Grendel (Podbrezová)
  Kelvin Pires (Trenčín)
  Chinonso Emeka (Trenčín)

Club
 Most yellow cards: 57
 Zlaté Moravce

 Most red cards: 7
 Trenčín

 Fewest yellow cards: 36
 Slovan Bratislava

 Fewest red cards: 0
 Slovan Bratislava
 Zlaté Moravce

Awards

Monthly awards

See also
 2022–23 Slovak Cup
 2022–23 2. Liga (Slovakia)
 2023–24 UEFA Champions League
 2023–24 UEFA Europa Conference League
 List of Slovak football transfers summer 2022
 List of Slovak football transfers winter 2022–23
 List of foreign Slovak First League players

References

External links
 

Slovak
2022-23
1
Current association football seasons